Diaporthe dulcamarae is a fungal plant pathogen of the genus Diaporthe.

References

External links

Fungal plant pathogens and diseases
dulcamarae
Fungi described in 1881